Shalabh Jagdishprasad Srivastava (born 22 September 1981 in Allahabad) is an Indian first-class cricketer. He is a left arm fast-medium bowler who played for Uttar Pradesh, Kings XI Punjab and Delhi Giants before he was banned.

Srivastava represented India in the 2000 ICC Under-19 Cricket World Cup in Sri Lanka where he topped their wicket taker's list with 14 victims. He was part of Uttar Pradesh's Ranji Trophy winning side in 2006–07.

Shalabh Srivastava was suspended by the Board of Control for Cricket in India for spot fixing on 15 May 2012, after a local news channel, India TV reportedly accused him along with 4 others based on a sting operation.

References

External links
 

1981 births
Living people
Indian cricketers
Uttar Pradesh cricketers
Central Zone cricketers
Cricketers from Allahabad
Punjab Kings cricketers
Delhi Giants cricketers
Cricketers banned for corruption